Thathri is a town and a notified area committee in Doda district in the Indian union territory of Jammu and Kashmir. Thathri valley is located in the foothills of the Himalayan mountains, about 85 km from Batote.  Apart from having ample forests, the town contains many small streams flowing through its various parts. It is located on the banks of the Chenab River and the town area is spread over 1.50 sq. Km².

Etymology
The word Thathri is derived from the Kashmiri word "Thath" (ٹہاٹھ) and according to some other historians, it is derived from the Hindi word "ठठेरा".

The word thathri is derived from 'thath', which locally means a heap of wood or timber collected on the bank of the river Chenab in earlier times. The activities of collection of wood and timber were performed by local people of ancient Thathri (now called Upper Thathri) and from other villages like Tipri, Badanoo, Barshalla, Jangalwar, and Phagsoo. The locals earned their living by working as labourers in the collection of wood in the form of huge heaps of wood and timber, which were later on transported to Jammu by different agencies, both government and private. So the name thathri has its origin from the word 'thath', which could still be narrated today from the records of forest departments and revenue departments. So far as the transportation of wood or timber through Chenab water to the last stop at the bank of the Chenab river at Thathri continued till the construction of the Dool Hasti power project dam. After that, this tradition was discontinued and wood and timber were directly transported through trucks and other vehicles from the source of timber in the present day district of Kishtwar to other parts of Jammu and Kashmir.

History

In ancient times, it was filled with the paddy fields of nearby villagers. As more and more people built their houses in place of these fields and finally it became a village. Over time, the population increased by people coming and settling here from nearby villages and also from places as far as Tral, Baramulla in Kashmir and the people who now settled in Thathri made it a center of business. The reasons for Kashmiri population settling here in the past in 17th or 18th century is matter of ambiguity between historians. However Sumantra Bose says it was repression by feudal class that drew people to the district of Doda.
In 2011 the population census reported that Thathri contained at least 93 villages.
Thathri was formerly a part of Tehsil Bhadarwah, until it separated as a new Tehsil in 1981. In 2011 Thathri was upgraded to a town. On 23 July 2014 it was upgraded to Subdivision, and is now divided into five Tehsils as Thathri, Phagsoo, Kahara , Chiralla and Bhela. The first municipal elections of Thathri town were held in October 2018.

On 22 July 2017, a flash flood affected Thathri, killing 6 people and washing away 6 homes.

Thathri town, the headquarters of Thathri tehsil, is an underdeveloping town in Doda district of Jammu and Kashmir as of 2019.

Thathri is a historical and commercially important town in the Thathri subdivision. It is located along the left bank of Chenab river and National Highway 244 passes through the town.

As of 2020, demand for district status in Thathri subdivision is increasing with number of arguments with the present district. On 1 February 2023, Thathri suffered from land subsidence that resulted in 300 people being displaced and 23 homes being declared unsafe; eight days later, another landslide blocked the highway that passes through the town.

Location
Thathri town is located in the foothills of the Lesser Himalayas, 34Km far from Doda city and 30Km from Kishtwar and Batote-Kishtwar National Highway 244 passes through the town.

Climate

Demographics
The population of Thathri tehsil as of the 2011 census is 59,955, of which 31,627 are men and 28,328 are women, living in 6,797 households spread across a total of 93 villages and 33 panchayats.

According to the 2011 census, the list of villages in Thathri along with their population is shown in the table below:

Nearby villages
Thathri is the single town in Thathri subdivision of Doda district in the union territory of Jammu and Kashmir in India. It is the main town for the Thathri subdivision and also the Tehsil headquarters. Thathri village promoted as town in 2010. It is approximately 36 km from the district headquarters at Doda.
Nearby villages include Zea Abad (0.05Km) Barshala (1.2 km),Sharote (2.5 km), Bagh(0.1 km). Drabshala (5.2 km), Tanta (10.5 km), Premnagar (12 km), and Bhatyass (15 km). The nearest towns are Doda (36 km), Bhaderwah (60 km), Bhalessa (Gandoh) (30.5 km) and Kishtwar (30.3 km).

Noon chai
Noon chai in kashmiri (commonly known in Hindi/Urdu as Namkeen Chai) or Pink Tea is a famous beverage of the people of Thathri. Villagers often start their workdays by sipping a cup of tea at their homes or hotels. Noon Chai (noon means salt, 'chai means tea) is eaten with traditional Kashmiri breads and pastries like lavasa, sheermaal, kandir chot, bakarkhani and kulcha. It is traditionally made from special tea leaves, milk, salt, and cooked in a samavar. A pinch of baking soda is added to help give it more of a pronounced pink color. A recent variant preparation of this tea also includes sugar but it is not traditionally consumed in Thathri.

See also 
 Jantroon Dhar
 Doda
 Bhalessa
 Gandoh
 Chiralla
 Thathri Disaster 2023
 Thathri-Gandoh National Highway

References

Cities and towns in Doda district
Chenab Valley
Doda district